A poorhouse  or workhouse is a government-run (usually by a county or municipality) facility to support and provide housing for the dependent or needy.

Workhouses
In England, Wales and Ireland (but not in Scotland), ‘workhouse’ has been the more common term. Before the introduction of the Poor Laws, each parish would maintain its own workhouse; often these would be simple farms with the occupants dividing their time between working the farm and being employed on maintaining local roads and other parish works. An example of one such is Strand House in East Sussex. In the early Victorian era (see Poor Law), poverty was seen as a dishonourable state. As depicted by Charles Dickens, a workhouse could resemble a reformatory, often housing whole families, or a penal labour regime giving manual work to the indigent and subjecting them to physical punishment. At many workhouses, men and women were split up with no communication between them. Furthermore, these workhouse systems were instituted under the Poor Law Amendment Act 1834: The United Kingdom passed this act to attempt to cut expenditure on those in poverty, reduce the number of beggars on the street, and inspire lower-class people to work harder in order to better provide for themselves.

Poor farms

United States 
In the United States, poorhouses were most common during the 19th and early 20th centuries. They were often situated on the grounds of a poor farm on which able-bodied residents were required to work. A poorhouse could even be part of the same economic complex as a prison farm and other penal or charitable public institutions. Poor farms were county- or town-run residences where paupers (mainly elderly and disabled people) were supported at public expense. They were generally under the direction of one or more elected or appointed "Superintendent[s] of the Poor."

Most were working farms that produced at least some of the produce, grain, and livestock they consumed. Residents were expected to provide labor to the extent that their health would allow, both in the fields and in providing housekeeping and care for other residents. Rules were strict and accommodations minimal.

Poor farms were based on the U.S. tradition of county governments (rather than cities, townships, or state or federal governments) providing social services for the needy within their borders. Following the 1854 veto of the Bill for the Benefit of the Indigent Insane by Franklin Pierce, the federal government did not participate in social welfare for over 70 years.

The poor farms declined in the U.S. after the Social Security Act took effect in 1935, with most disappearing completely by about 1950. Since the 1970s, funding for the care, well-being and safety of the poor and indigent is now split among county, state and federal resources. Poor farms have been replaced by subsidized housing such as public housing projects, Section 8 housing  and homeless shelters.

Canada 
In Canada, the poorhouse, with an attached farm, was the favoured model. According to a 2009 report by the Toronto Star, "pauperism was considered a moral failing that could be erased through order and hard work". The oldest government-supported facility of this type that is still standing (now a museum), is located in Southern Ontario between Fergus and Elora. The Wellington County House of Industry and Refuge was opened in 1877 and, over the years, housed approximately 1500 deserving poor, including those who were destitute, old and infirm, or disabled. The 60-bed house for inmates was surrounded by a 30-acre industrial farm with a barn for livestock that produced some of the food for the 70 residents and the staff and also provided work for them. Others worked in the House itself. A hospital was added in 1892. The nearby cemetery has 271 plots. In 1947, the House was converted into a home for the aged and in 1975 the building reopened as the Wellington County Museum and Archives, one of the National Historic Sites of Canada.

Gallery

See also
Almshouse
Low income housing
Scottish poorhouse
Homeless shelter

References

Further reading 
 
 Rothman, David J., (editor). "The Almshouse Experience", in series Poverty U.S.A.: The Historical Record, 1971. 
 Sweeney, Ed. (1927). Poorhouse Sweeney - Life in a County Poorhouse, with a foreword by Theodore Dreiser. New York: Bony & Liveright.

External links

Jack London's firsthand account of life and poorhouses in the 1902 East End of London
Workhouses in and around Bures, Suffolk, by Alan Beales
 McLean County, Illinois Poor Farm Finding Aid
 A study of Kansas poor farms / by Kansas Emergency Relief Committee (1935)

House
Public housing
 
Workhouses
Poverty
ja:救貧院 (プアハウス)